Emma Mukandi ( Mitchell; born 19 September 1992) is a Scottish professional footballer who plays for FA WSL club Reading. She began her senior career with Glasgow City then joined German Frauen-Bundesliga club SGS Essen. Primarily a defender, Mukandi has also played as a forward. Mukandi also plays for the Scotland women's national football team.

Club career
Born in Kirkcaldy, she grew up in the town of Buckhaven, Fife. Mukandi went on to become the only girl to play for her local high school team at the age of twelve. She started her career with St Johnstone Girls, alongside fellow future Frauen-Bundesliga player Lisa Evans, before both girls joined Scottish Women's Premier League champions Glasgow City in August 2008.

At the end of the 2012 season, Mukandi had a trial period in Denmark with earlier Champions League opponents Fortuna Hjørring, before heading for further trials in Sweden and Germany.

Mukandi signed professionally for Frauen-Bundesliga side SGS Essen in January 2013. After just four months, reports in Germany linked Mukandi with a transfer to English champions Arsenal. Arsenal confirmed the move on 22 July 2013.

Whilst at Arsenal, Mukandi won an FA Cup in 2014 with WSL Cups coming in 2013 and 2015. With the Gunners, she also went on a successful run to the FA Cup final of 2016. Arsenal beat Chelsea 1–0 at Wembley and Mukandi lifted the 2016 FA Cup.

On 3 January 2020, it was announced that Mukandi would be joining Tottenham Hotspur on loan for the rest of the season.

Reading
On 15 July 2020, Reading announced the signing of Mukandi from Arsenal. On 20 July 2022, Reading announced that Mukandi had returned to the club and signed a one-year contract, following the birth of her daughter. On 7 September 2022, Reading announced that Mukandi was their new club captain.

International career
After captaining both the national Under-17 and Under-19 teams, Mukandi made her debut with the senior Scottish national team against France in May 2011. Despite conceding a penalty in Scotland's 1–1 draw, her contribution was praised by coach Anna Signeul: "Emma Mitchell did really well on her first appearance. It is a shame that she conceded the penalty, it was just a bit of inexperience to be honest, but she didn't let her head go down and kept working hard." 

Mukandi attended the Scottish Football Association National Performance Centre at the University of Stirling. She scored her first goal for the Senior women's side against Iceland in August 2012 and later that year scored against Spain in a 2013 UEFA Women's Euro Play-off defeat.

She was ruled out of the Scotland squad for UEFA Women's Euro 2017 by a hamstring injury. After injury disrupted her appearances for Arsenal in the 2018–19 season, she was left out of the squad for the 2019 FIFA Women's World Cup in France.

Mukandi was recalled to the Scotland squad in August 2022, as she resumed her playing career after giving birth in November 2021.

Career statistics

Club

International goals
. Scotland score listed first, score column indicates score after each of her goals.

Personal life
In October 2019, Mukandi spoke about her struggles with her mental health issues.

Mukandi was left out of the Scotland international squad in June 2021 as she had recently become pregnant. On 28 November 2021, she gave birth to a baby girl.

In August 2022, she married Head of Strength & Conditioning at Ipswich Town, Ivan Mukandi.

Honours

Club
Glasgow City
Scottish Women's Premier League: 2009, 2010, 2011, 2012
Scottish Women's Cup: 2009, 2011, 2012
Scottish Women's Premier League Cup: 2009, 2012

Arsenal
FA WSL: 2018–19
FA Cup: 2014, 2016
WSL Cup: 2013, 2015, 2017–18

Individual
PFA Team of the Year: 2014–15

References

External links
Profile at Eurosport.com

1992 births
Living people
Footballers from Kirkcaldy
Scottish women's footballers
Scotland women's international footballers
Glasgow City F.C. players
Arsenal W.F.C. players
SGS Essen players
Tottenham Hotspur F.C. Women players
Scottish expatriate women's footballers
Expatriate women's footballers in Germany
Women's Super League players
Women's association football defenders
Women's association football forwards
Frauen-Bundesliga players
Scottish expatriate sportspeople in Germany